Seminars in Thrombosis and Hemostasis is a peer-reviewed medical review journal covering hematology, with a specific focus on disorders related to thrombosis and hemostasis. It was established in 1974 and is published eight times per year by Thieme Medical Publishers. The editor-in-chief is Emmanuel J. Favaloro. According to the Journal Citation Reports, the journal has a 2018 impact factor of 3.401.

References

External links

Thieme academic journals
Hematology journals
8 times per year journals
English-language journals
Review journals
Publications established in 1974